Frederico Neves Souza Santana, known as Fred Santana (born 12 April 1988) is a Brazilian football player who plays for Tourizense.

Club career
He made his professional debut in the Venezuelan Primera División for Atlético El Vigía on 20 January 2013 in a game against Aragua.

References

1988 births
Footballers from São Paulo
Living people
Brazilian footballers
Esporte Clube Taubaté players
Atlético El Vigía players
Brazilian expatriate footballers
Expatriate footballers in Venezuela
Venezuelan Primera División players
Clube Atlético Taboão da Serra players
Ferroviário Atlético Clube (CE) players
Expatriate footballers in Portugal
Anadia F.C. players
G.D. Tourizense players
Association football forwards
F.C. Oliveira do Hospital players